An imamzadeh is a  Persian term with two related meanings: a type of holy person in Shia Islam, and the shrine-tomb of such a person.

Firstly, it means an immediate descendant of a Shi'i Imam. The term is also used in Urdu and Azeri. Imamzadeh means "offspring" or descendant of an imam. There are many different ways of spelling the word in English, such as imamzada, imamzadah and emamzadah. Imamzadeh are basically the Syed's or Syeda's as they have descended from the Imams. Imamzadehs are also sayyids, though not all sayyids are considered imamzadehs.

There are many important imamzadehs. Two of these are Fātimah bint Mūsā, the sister of Imam Ali al-Ridha, the eighth Twelver Imam, and Zaynab bint Ali, daughter of Ali, considered by Shi'i Muslims to be the first Imam and by Sunni Muslims as the fourth Rashid. Imamzadehs are not traditionally women.

Secondly, imamzadeh is a term for a shrine-tomb of the descendants of Imams, who are directly related to Muhammad. These shrines are only for the descendants of Imams and they are not for the Imams themselves. These shrine-tombs are used as centers of Shi'i devotion and pilgrimages. They are believed to have miraculous properties and the ability to heal. Many of them are located in Iraq, Medina, India and Iran.

Many people visit the imamzadehs that are relatively close to them. There are also special ziyarat-namas (pilgrimages) for many of the imamzadehs. Some of these pilgrimages even happen annually during the certain time of year. Some of the imamzadehs are not as well kept as others. According to Reinisch, an imamzadeh that he saw was mostly in ruins, though it is still important.

List of imamzadeh shrine-tombs
 Imamzadeh Hamzah, Tabriz
 Imamzadeh Hamzeh, Kashmar
 Imamzadeh Ja'far, Borujerd
 Imamzadeh Ja'far, Damghan
 Imamzadeh Ja'far, Isfahan
 Imamzadeh Saleh, Shemiran
 Imamzadeh Sultan Mutahhar
 Shah-Abdol-Azim shrine
 Shah Cheragh
 Imamzadeh (Ganja)
 Imamzadeh Ahmad
 Imamzadeh Esmaeil and Isaiah mausoleum
 Imamzadeh Haroun-e-Velayat
 Imamzadeh Mohammad
 Imamzadeh Seyed Morteza
 Imamzadeh Shah Zeyd
 Imamzade Hossein, Qazvin

Popular culture
The Imamzadas were so influential that some cities or parts of cities are named after the Imamzadas who are buried there, for example, Torbat-e Heydarieh, Astaneh-ye Ashrafiyeh in Gilan, Astaneh near Arak, and Shahreza.

See also
 Sayyid
 Holiest sites in Shia Islam
 Ziyarat
 Iranian architecture

References

Shia imams
Islamic terminology
Shia Islam
Architecture in Iran
Tombs in Iran
Islamic pilgrimages
Shrines in Iran